Doug Bing (born 1950 or 1951) is a Canadian politician, who was elected to the Legislative Assembly of British Columbia in the 2013 provincial election. He represented the electoral district of Maple Ridge-Pitt Meadows as a member of the British Columbia Liberal Party. He was defeated for re-election in 2017 by Lisa Beare.

Prior to his election to the legislature, Bing was a three-term municipal councillor in Pitt Meadows.

Electoral record

References

Living people
British Columbia Liberal Party MLAs
British Columbia municipal councillors
People from Pitt Meadows
21st-century Canadian politicians
Year of birth uncertain
Canadian dentists
Canadian politicians of Chinese descent
Year of birth missing (living people)